The discography of Ladyhawke, a New Zealand electropop singer-songwriter, consists of four studio albums, two extended plays and eighteen singles. Ladyhawke began her career in 2001 as the guitarist for the hard rock band Two Lane Blacktop. The group disbanded in 2003 and she then joined the pop-rock band Teenager.

Her self-titled solo debut studio album was released in September 2008. The album reached number one in New Zealand and number 16 in Australia and the United Kingdom – it was certified platinum by the Recording Industry Association of New Zealand (RIANZ) and gold by the Australian Record Industry Association (ARIA) and the British Phonographic Industry (BPI). Five singles, "Back of the Van", "Paris Is Burning", "Dusk Till Dawn", "My Delirium" and "Magic", were released from the album: "My Delirium" peaked within the top ten in Australia and New Zealand.

Ladyhawke worked extensively with producer Pascal Gabriel in recording her second studio album, Anxiety, which was released in May 2012. The album peaked at number 12 in New Zealand and on the United States Billboard Top Heatseekers chart. Three singles were released from the album: "Black White & Blue", "Sunday Drive" and "Blue Eyes", with "Black White & Blue" charting at number 32 on the Ultratip chart in the Flanders region of Belgium.

Ladyhawke's third album Wild Things was released 3 June 2016 and was primarily produced by Tommy English. Two singles were released from Wild Things, "A Love Song" and "Wild Things".

Ladyhawke's fourth album, Time Flies was released on 19 November 2021. Four singles were released from the album: "Guilty Love", which is a collaboration with New Zealand indie pop act Broods, "Mixed Emotions", "Think About You" and "My Love".

Studio albums

Extended plays

Singles

Music videos

Other appearances

Notes

References

External links
 
 

Discographies of New Zealand artists
Electronic music discographies
Pop music discographies
Rock music discographies